Alfred Biehle (15 November 1926 in Augsburg – 29 October 2014 in Karlstadt am Main) was a German politician, representative of the Christian Social Union of Bavaria.

Between 1990 and 1995 he was a Parliamentary Commissioner for the Armed Forces of Germany (a representative of the ).

See also
List of Bavarian Christian Social Union politicians

References

Christian Social Union in Bavaria politicians
Military Ombudspersons in Germany
Members of the Bundestag for Bavaria
Members of the Bundestag 1987–1990
Members of the Bundestag 1983–1987
Members of the Bundestag 1980–1983
Members of the Bundestag 1976–1980
Members of the Bundestag 1972–1976
Members of the Bundestag 1969–1972
1926 births
2014 deaths
Knights Commander of the Order of Merit of the Federal Republic of Germany